Granlund is a surname. Notable people with the surname include:

Albin Granlund (born 1989), Finnish footballer
Barbara Granlund (born 1928), American politician
Kerstin Granlund (born 1951), Swedish comedian and actress
Marie Granlund (born 1962), Swedish politician
Markus Granlund (born 1993), Finnish ice hockey player
Mattias Granlund (born 1992), Swedish ice hockey player
Mikael Granlund (born 1992), Finnish ice hockey player
Nils Granlund (1890–1957), American show producer, entertainment industry entrepreneur and radio industry pioneer
Odd Granlund (1910–1982), Norwegian broadcaster
Paul Granlund (1925–2003), American sculptor
Petra Granlund (born 1987), Swedish swimmer
Sverre Granlund (1918–1943), Norwegian soldier
Trond Granlund (born 1950), Norwegian singer and musician